Costa Prasoulas is an Australian actor and martial artist trained in Muay Thai, Hapkido, Taekwondo, Pankration and Brazilian jiu-jitsu, having won the Australian Open Martial Arts Championship in 1992, Intercontinental Kickboxing Champion and won a silver medal at the 2009 World Games. His acting credits include Cop's Enemy.

References 

Australian male film actors
Australian male mixed martial artists
Mixed martial artists utilizing Muay Thai
Mixed martial artists utilizing hapkido
Mixed martial artists utilizing taekwondo
Mixed martial artists utilizing pankration
Mixed martial artists utilizing Brazilian jiu-jitsu
Australian Muay Thai practitioners
Australian hapkido practitioners
Australian male taekwondo practitioners
Australian practitioners of Brazilian jiu-jitsu